The Samaia River or Simaia River is a river in Sandaun Province, Papua New Guinea. The river flows through Green River Rural LLG.

Various Papuan languages are spoken in the watershed of the Samaia River, including the Amto–Musan languages (also called the Samaia River languages).

See also
List of rivers of Papua New Guinea
Arai–Samaia languages
Amto–Musan languages

References

Rivers of Papua New Guinea